The Standard of Revolt (French: Le drapeau rouge), a French revolutionary song
 Le Drapeau Rouge, a publication of the Communist Party in Wallonia
 Le Drapeau Rouge, a publication of the Revolutionary Communist Party of Canada